The IMOCA ("Open 60"), is a 60ft development class  monohull sailing yacht administered by the International Monohull Open Class Association (IMOCA). The class pinnacle event are single or two person ocean races, such as the Route du Rhum and the Vendée Globe and this has been intimately linked to design development within the class.

Class description
This class is of "open" design, this means the boat is measurement controlled and therefore designers have freedom within the rules.

Design restrictions include the length (between 59 and ) and maximum draft. There are no explicit restrictions on beam, mast height or sail area although these are all indirectly controlled by flotation and self-righting capability requirements. The rules also tackle safety and survival design and equipment.

This class is recognised by World Sailing.

Events 
These races are open to, but not necessarily limited to this class.
 Barcelona World Race
 
 Rolex Fastnet Race
 Route du Rhum
 Single-Handed Trans-Atlantic Race
 Transat Jacques Vabre
 Transat Québec–Saint-Malo
 Vendée Globe limited to IMOCAs
 The Ocean Race from 2021.

Evolution

Radical ideas
 Project Amazon - Twin "main" masted, no real headsails
 Canting rig (common on multihulls)

Semi foiling

See also
 Open 50

References

External links

Classes of World Sailing
Single-handed sailing
Development sailing classes
Box rule sailing classes